Don Luis López de la Torre Ayllón y Kirsmacker (29 March 1799 in Hamburg, Holy Roman Empire – 2 December 1875 in Madrid, Spain) was a Spanish nobleman,  politician and diplomat who served as Minister of State in 1835.

References

|-

Foreign ministers of Spain
1799 births
1875 deaths
Moderate Party (Spain) politicians
19th-century Spanish politicians